Yves Loubet (aka Publimmo) is a French rally driver born on October 31, 1958 in Mostaganem (Mostaganem, former French Algeria). His son Pierre-Louis Loubet is also rally driver.

Career 

He started racing in 1976 on an Opel Kadett. He has participated in the Tour de Corse (2nd in 1987 and 1988 on Lancia Delta HF 4WD and Integrale official Martini Racing, 3rd in 1986 on Alfa Romeo GTV6 Group A, following the tragic accident of Henri Toivonen and the withdrawal of the other official Lancia, as well as participation in the Rallye San Remo and Monte Carlo.

He was European champion in 1989 on Lancia Delta Integrale, co-driven by Jean-Marc Andrié, and finished vice-champion of France rally in 1985 on an official Alfa Romeo (winner of Group A).

He also participated in 30 rallies counting for the world rally championship and the WRC, from 1977 to 1999.

In 2003 he won the Rallye des Pharaons in rally-raid, with Jacky Dubois as co-driver.

Since 2008, he organizes, with José Andréani, the "Historic" version of the Ronde de la Giraglia.

He organizes the Maroc 'Historic' Rally since its first edition in 2009. 

To keep alive the spirit of one of the toughest rallys from the past, Rally of Morocco.

This year, 2019, the 10th edition, has been won by former 'Group N' world champion (1989 and 1990), Alain Oreille assisted by copilot 

Sylvie Oreille.

Achievements 
1999 - 3rd in the Rally of Lebanon (Middle East Championship) - Lancia Delta HF Integrale - co-driver, Bruno Brissart
1996 - 2nd of the Rally of the Azores (European Championship and Portugal)
1995 - 3 rd of the Semperit Rally (European and Austrian championship)
1993 - 5th in the French Rally Championship
1992 - Rally São Miguel / Azores (European and Portuguese championship)
1991 - 2 victories in the French Rally Championship (Rallye du Rouergue and Rallye du Mont-Blanc)
1990 - 5th of the French Rally Championship
1989 - European Rally Champion - Lancia Delta Integrale, Team Grifone, with 4 victories:
25th Rally Catalunya - Costa Brava (rally of Spain )
30 th Rally Vinho da Madeira ( Portugal )
14 th Elpa Halkidiki Rally ( Greece )
17th Rally of Cyprus
and 2nd at the Albena-Zlatni Piassatzi ( Bulgaria ), Garrigues-Languedoc-Roussillon, and Poland rallies, and 3rd at the Deutschland ADAC Rally 
1988 - 10th in the World Rally Championship . Victory at the Garrigues-Languedoc-Roussillon Rally ( 2nd Division European and French Championship). 3rd of the automobile Tour of Italy
1985 - 2nd in the French Rally Championship - Alfa Romeo GTV6 Group A

Results in World Rally Championship 
2nd Tour de Corse 1987 - Lancia Delta HF 4WD Martini Racing
2nd Tour de Corse 1988 - Lancia Delta Integrale Martini Racing
3rd Tour de Corse 1986 - Alfa Romeo GTV6 Rothmans
3rd Portugal Rally 1988 - Lancia Delta Integrale Martini Racing
4th Tour de Corse 1989 - Lancia delta Integrale Martini racing
5th Tour de Corse 1985 - Alfa Romeo GTV6

References

External links 
 Yves Loubet sur www.ewrc-results.com;
 Yves Loubet sur www.rallye-info.com;
 Yves Loubet sur www.rallybase.nl.

French rally drivers
1958 births
World Rally Championship drivers
Living people
European Rally Championship drivers